Sarton is a commune in the Pas-de-Calais department in the Hauts-de-France region of France.

Geography

The average altitude of Sarton is 74 meters, and its surface area is 6.6 km2.

Population
The inhabitants are called Sartonais.

Places of interest
 The church of Notre-Dame, dating from the sixteenth century.
 An old mill.
 Les Jardins de Sans-Soucis (the Worriless Gardens), a garden built in 1998 around a 16th to 17th century manor with topiaries, including a collection of old garden tools and a permanent art exhibition.

See also
Communes of the Pas-de-Calais department

References

Communes of Pas-de-Calais